The Shoufeng River, also spelled Shoufong River, is a tributary of the Hualien River in Taiwan. It flows through Hualien County for 37 km before joining the Hualien River in Shoufeng, Hualien.

See also
List of rivers in Taiwan

References

Rivers of Taiwan
Landforms of Hualien County